St. Dominic's College is an arts and science college in Kanjirappally, Kerala, India. It is affiliated to the Mahatma Gandhi University and is reaccredited A grade by NAAC.

Campus
St. Dominic's College (also known as SD College) is located in Kanjirappally, Kottayam.  The campus is 4 km from Kanjirappally town along the NH 220 highway. The campus is connected by buses to Kottayam, Pala and Changanacherry.

The facilities are integrated into a single block. The administrative section is located at the ground floor. The departments are distributed across the two wings of the entrance.

The college has an auditorium with integrated indoor sports facilities. The auditorium was constructed to commemorate the Silver Jubilee of the college.

The college sports stadium is located to the right of the main building.

History
St Dominic's College was started in 1965 under the Catholic management of St Dominic's Forane Church, Kanjirappally, to cater to the higher educational needs of the parish in particular, and of the eastern parts of the Archdiocese of Changanacherry in general. When the new Diocese of Kanjirappally was formed in 1977, St Dominic's College became the only institution offering higher education in the whole diocese. The college also includes in its purview the academic aspirations of the non-Catholic communities of the area and is committed to imparting education to all who seek higher learning at these doors, irrespective of caste, creed and community.

Notable alumni 
Reji Joseph Pulluthuruthiyil, Indian journalist
Thampi Kannanthanam

References 
 NAAC accreditation

External links 
 St. Dominic's College

Catholic universities and colleges in India
Arts and Science colleges in Kerala
Colleges affiliated to Mahatma Gandhi University, Kerala
Universities and colleges in Kottayam district
Educational institutions established in 1965
1965 establishments in Kerala